Izvor is a village in Slivnitsa Municipality, Sofia Province, located in western Bulgaria approximately 10 km west of the town of Slivnitsa.

References

 Статистика населения

Villages in Sofia Province